Xu Jialu (born 1937) was a vice-chairman of the Standing Committee of the National People's Congress and was head of the College of Chinese Language and Culture at Beijing Normal University.

Life
Xu was born in Beijing, though his ancestral home is in Huai'an, Jiangsu.

He studied at Beijing Normal University from 1954 to 1959 and graduated with a degree in Chinese literature. He worked as assistant lecturer, associate professor, dean and finally vice-president at Beijing Normal University from 1959 to 1987.  Xu was a standing committee member of the China Association for Promoting Democracy (CAPD) Central Committee, vice chairman of the Chinese People's Political Consultative Conference Beijing Municipal Committee, vice chairman of the 9th CAPD Central Committee, chairman of the CAPD Central Committee in 1987–1994, chairman of the State language Work Committee and chairman of the State Language Work Committee in 1994–1997, president of the CAPD National Committee and chairman of the State Language Work Committee in 1997–1998.  In 2003, Xu received an honorary doctorate from the Hong Kong Baptist University.

Bibliography

Articles

Books
 Wei Chuo Ji (未辍集)
 Yuyan Wenzixue Ji Qi Yingyong Yanjiu(语言文字学及其应用研究)

References

1937 births
Living people
People's Republic of China politicians from Beijing
Members of the China Association for Promoting Democracy
Beijing Normal University alumni
Academic staff of Beijing Normal University
Educators from Beijing
Writers from Beijing
People's Republic of China writers
Chinese non-fiction writers